A referendum on the presidency of Jaafar Nimeiry was held in Sudan on 15 September 1971. It came after Nimeiry was overthrown in a Communist coup in July, followed by his reinstatement. He was backed by 98.6% of voters, with a turnout of 92.9%.

Results

References

1971 in Sudan
Presidential elections in Sudan
Sudan
Sudan
Single-candidate elections
September 1971 events in Africa
Election and referendum articles with incomplete results